HD 192699 is a yellow subgiant star located approximately 214 light-years away in the constellation of Aquila. It has the apparent magnitude of 6.45. Based on its mass of 1.68 solar, it was an A-type star when it was a main-sequence. In April 2007, a planet was announced orbiting the star, together with HD 175541 b and HD 210702 b.

The star HD 192699 is named Chechia. The name was selected in the NameExoWorlds campaign by Tunisia, during the 100th anniversary of the IAU. Chechia is a flat-surfaced, traditional red wool hat.

See also
 HD 175541
 HD 210702
 List of extrasolar planets

References

External links
 
 

G-type subgiants
Planetary systems with one confirmed planet
Aquila (constellation)
Durchmusterung objects
192699
099894